Pen Sokong (born 5 March 1994) is an Olympic sprinter from Cambodia.

He competed at the 2019 IAAF World Athletics Championships in Doha in the 100m and 200m. He competed at the Athletics at the 2020 Summer Olympics – Men's 100 metres in Tokyo.

References

External links
 

1994 births
Living people
Cambodian male sprinters
Olympic athletes of Cambodia
Athletes (track and field) at the 2020 Summer Olympics
Olympic male sprinters
Asian Games competitors for Cambodia
Athletes (track and field) at the 2018 Asian Games
Sportspeople from Phnom Penh